Acid mine drainage, acid and metalliferous drainage (AMD), or acid rock drainage (ARD) is the outflow of acidic water from metal mines or coal mines.

Acid rock drainage occurs naturally within some environments as part of the rock weathering process but is exacerbated by large-scale earth disturbances characteristic of mining and other large construction activities, usually within rocks containing an abundance of sulfide minerals. Areas where the earth has been disturbed (e.g. construction sites, subdivisions, and transportation corridors) may create acid rock drainage. In many localities, the liquid that drains from coal stocks, coal handling facilities, coal washeries, and coal waste tips can be highly acidic, and in such cases it is treated as acid rock drainage. This liquid often contains highly toxic metals, such as copper or iron. These, combined with reduced pH, have a detrimental impact on the streams aquatic environments.

The same type of chemical reactions and processes may occur through the disturbance of acid sulfate soils formed under coastal or estuarine conditions after the last major sea level rise, and constitutes a similar environmental hazard.

Nomenclature
Historically, the acidic discharges from active or abandoned mines were called acid mine drainage, or AMD. The term acid rock drainage, or ARD, was introduced in the 1980s and 1990s to indicate that acidic drainage can originate from sources other than mines. For example, a paper presented in 1991 at a major international conference on this subject was titled: "The Prediction of Acid Rock Drainage – Lessons from the Database". Both AMD and ARD refer to low pH or acidic waters caused by the oxidation of sulfide minerals, though ARD is the more generic name.

In cases where drainage from a mine is not acidic and has dissolved metals or metalloids, or was originally acidic, but has been neutralized along its flow path, then it is described as "neutral mine drainage", "mining-influenced water" or otherwise. None of these other names have gained general acceptance.

Occurrence

Sub-surface mining often progresses below the water table, so water must be constantly pumped out of the mine in order to prevent flooding. When a mine is abandoned, the pumping ceases, and water floods the mine. This introduction of water is the initial step in most acid rock drainage situations. Tailings piles or ponds, mine waste rock dumps, and coal spoils are also an important source of acid mine drainage.

After being exposed to air and water, oxidation of metal sulfides (often pyrite, which is iron-sulfide) within the surrounding rock and overburden generates acidity. Colonies of bacteria and archaea greatly accelerate the decomposition of metal ions, although the reactions also occur in an abiotic environment. These microbes, called extremophiles for their ability to survive in harsh conditions, occur naturally in the rock, but limited water and oxygen supplies usually keep their numbers low. Extremophiles known as acidophiles especially favor the low pH levels of abandoned mines. In particular, Acidithiobacillus ferrooxidans is a key contributor to pyrite oxidation.

Metal mines may generate highly acidic discharges where the ore is a sulfide mineral or is associated with pyrite. In these cases the predominant metal ion may not be iron but rather zinc, copper, or nickel. The most commonly mined ore of copper, chalcopyrite, is itself a copper-iron-sulfide and occurs with a range of other sulfides. Thus, copper mines are often major culprits of acid mine drainage.

At some mines, acidic drainage is detected within 2–5 years after mining begins, whereas at other mines, it is not detected for several decades. In addition, acidic drainage may be generated for decades or centuries after it is first detected. For this reason, acid mine drainage is considered a serious long-term environmental problem associated with mining.

Chemistry

The chemistry of oxidation of pyrites, the production of ferrous ions and subsequently ferric ions, is very complex, and this complexity has considerably inhibited the design of effective treatment options.

Although a host of chemical processes contribute to acid mine drainage, pyrite oxidation is by far the greatest contributor. A general equation for this process is:

2FeS2{\scriptstyle (s)} + 7O2{\scriptstyle (g)} + 2H2O{\scriptstyle (l)} -> 2Fe^2+ {\scriptstyle (aq)} + 4SO4^{2-}{\scriptstyle (aq)} + 4H+{\scriptstyle (aq)}.

The oxidation of the sulfide to sulfate solubilizes the ferrous iron (iron(II)), which is subsequently oxidized to ferric iron (iron(III)):

4Fe^2+{\scriptstyle (aq)} + O2{\scriptstyle (g)} + 4H+{\scriptstyle (aq)} -> 4Fe^3+{\scriptstyle (aq)} + 2H2O{\scriptstyle (l)}.
Either of these reactions can occur spontaneously or can be catalyzed by microorganisms that derive energy from the oxidation reaction.  The ferric cations produced can also oxidize additional pyrite and reduce into ferrous ions:

FeS2{\scriptstyle (s)} + 14Fe^3+{\scriptstyle (aq)} + 8H2O{\scriptstyle (l)} -> 15Fe^2+{\scriptstyle (aq)} + 2SO4^{2-}{\scriptstyle (aq)} + 16H+{\scriptstyle (aq)}.
The net effect of these reactions is to release H+, which lowers the pH and maintains the solubility of the ferric ion.

Effects

Effects on pH

Water temperatures as high as  have been measured underground at the Iron Mountain Mine, and the pH can be as low as −3.6.

Organisms which cause acid mine drainage can thrive in waters with pH very close to zero. Negative pH occurs when water evaporates from already acidic pools thereby increasing the concentration of hydrogen ions.

About half of the coal mine discharges in Pennsylvania have pH under 5. However, a portion of mine drainage in both the bituminous and anthracite regions of Pennsylvania is alkaline, because limestone in the overburden neutralizes acid before the drainage emanates.

Yellow boy
When the pH of acid mine drainage is raised past 3, either through contact with fresh water or neutralizing minerals, previously soluble iron(III) ions precipitate as iron(III) hydroxide, a yellow-orange solid colloquially known as yellow boy. Other types of iron precipitates are possible, including iron oxides and oxyhydroxides, and sulfates such as jarosite. All these precipitates can discolor water and smother plant and animal life on the streambed, disrupting stream ecosystems (a specific offense under the Fisheries Act in Canada). The process also produces additional hydrogen ions, which can further decrease pH.  In some cases, the concentrations of iron hydroxides in yellow boy are so high, the precipitate can be recovered for commercial use in pigments.

Trace metal and semi-metal contamination
Many acid rock discharges also contain elevated levels of potentially toxic metals, especially nickel and copper with lower levels of a range of trace and semi-metal ions such as lead, arsenic, aluminium, and manganese. The elevated levels of heavy metals can only be dissolved in waters that have a low pH, as is found in the acidic waters produced by pyrite oxidation. In the coal belt around the south Wales valleys in the UK highly acidic nickel-rich discharges from coal stocking sites have proved to be particularly troublesome.

Effects on aquatic wildlife 
Acid mine drainage also affects the wildlife living within the affected body of water. Aquatic macroinvertebrates living in streams or parts of streams affected by acid mine drainage show fewer individuals, less diversity, and lower biomass. Many species of fish also cannot tolerate the pollution. Among the macroinvertebrates, certain species can be found at only certain levels of pollution, while other species can be found over a wide range.

Identification and prediction 
In a mining setting it is leading practice to carry out a geochemical assessment of mine materials during the early stages of a project to determine the potential for AMD. The geochemical assessment aims to map the distribution and variability of key geochemical parameters, acid generating and element leaching characteristics.

The assessment may include:
 Sampling;
 Static geochemical testwork (e.g. acid-base accounting, sulfur speciation);
 Kinetic geochemical testwork - Conducting oxygen consumption tests, such as the OxCon, to quantify acidity generation rates
 Modelling of oxidation, pollutant generation and release; and
 Modelling of material composition.

Treatment

Oversight
In the United Kingdom, many discharges from abandoned mines are exempt from regulatory control. In such cases the Environment Agency and Natural Resources Wales working with partners such as the Coal Authority have provided some innovative solutions, including constructed wetland solutions such as on the River Pelenna in the valley of the River Afan near Port Talbot and the constructed wetland next to the River Neath at Ynysarwed.

Although abandoned underground mines produce most of the acid mine drainage, some recently mined and reclaimed surface mines have produced ARD and have degraded local ground-water and surface-water resources. Acidic water produced at active mines must be neutralized to achieve pH 6–9 before discharge from a mine site to a stream is permitted.

In Canada, work to reduce the effects of acid mine drainage is concentrated under the Mine Environment Neutral Drainage (MEND) program. Total liability from acid rock drainage is estimated to be between $2 billion and C$5 billion.  Over a period of eight years, MEND claims to have reduced ARD liability by up to C$400 million, from an investment of C$17.5 million.

Methods

Lime neutralization
By far, the most commonly used commercial process for treating acid mine drainage is lime (CaO) precipitation in a high-density sludge (HDS) process. In this application, a slurry of lime is dispersed into a tank containing acid mine drainage and recycled sludge to increase water pH to about 9. At this pH, most toxic metals become insoluble and precipitate, aided by the presence of recycled sludge. Optionally, air may be introduced in this tank to oxidize iron and manganese and assist in their precipitation. The resulting slurry is directed to a sludge-settling vessel, such as a clarifier. In that vessel, clean water will overflow for release, whereas settled metal precipitates (sludge) will be recycled to the acid mine drainage treatment tank, with a sludge-wasting side stream. A number of variations of this process exist, as dictated by the chemistry of ARD, its volume, and other factors. Generally, the products of the HDS process also contain gypsum (CaSO4) and unreacted lime, which enhance both its settleability and resistance to re-acidification and metal mobilization. A general equation for this process is:

H2SO4 + CaO → CaSO4 + H2O
or more precisely in aqueous solution:
 + 2 H+  + Ca2+O2−(aq) → Ca2+ + (aq) + 2 H+ + O2−(aq)

Less complex variants of this process, such as simple lime neutralization, may involve no more than a lime silo, mixing tank and settling pond. These systems are far less costly to build, but are also less efficient (longer reaction times are required, and they produce a discharge with higher trace metal concentrations, if present). They would be suitable for relatively small flows or less complex acid mine drainage.

Calcium silicate neutralization
A calcium silicate feedstock, made from processed steel slag, can also be used to neutralize active acidity in AMD systems by removing free hydrogen ions from the bulk solution, thereby increasing pH. As the silicate anion captures H+ ions (raising the pH), it forms monosilicic acid (H4SiO4), a neutral solute. Monosilicic acid remains in the bulk solution to play many roles in correcting the adverse effects of acidic conditions. In the bulk solution, the silicate anion is very active in neutralizing H+ cations in the soil solution. While its mode-of-action is quite different from limestone, the ability of calcium silicate to neutralize acid solutions is equivalent to limestone as evidenced by its CCE value of 90–100% and its relative neutralizing value of 98%.

In the presence of heavy metals, calcium silicate reacts in a different manner than limestone. As limestone raises the pH of the bulk solution, and if heavy metals are present, precipitation of the metal hydroxides (with extremely low solubilities) is normally accelerated and the potential of armoring of limestone particles increases significantly. In the calcium silicate aggregate, as silicic acid species are absorbed onto the metal surface, the development of silica layers (mono- and bi-layers) lead to the formation of colloidal complexes with neutral or negative surface charges. These negatively charged colloids create an electrostatic repulsion with each other (as well as with the negatively charged calcium silicate granules) and the sequestered metal colloids are stabilized and remain in a dispersed state – effectively interrupting metal precipitation and reducing vulnerability of the material to armoring.

Carbonate neutralization
Generally, limestone or other calcareous strata that could neutralize acid are lacking or deficient at sites that produce acidic rock drainage. Limestone chips may be introduced into sites to create a neutralizing effect. Where limestone has been used, such as at Cwm Rheidol in mid Wales, the positive impact has been much less than anticipated because of the creation of an insoluble calcium sulfate layer on the limestone chips, binding the material and preventing further neutralization.

Ion exchange
Cation exchange processes have previously been investigated as a potential treatment for acid mine drainage. The principle is that an ion exchange resin can remove potentially toxic metals (cationic resins), or chlorides, sulfates and uranyl sulfate complexes (anionic resins) from mine water. Once the contaminants are adsorbed, the exchange sites on resins must be regenerated, which typically requires acidic and basic reagents and generates a brine that contains the pollutants in a concentrated form. A South African company that won the 2013 IChemE (ww.icheme.org) award for water management and supply (treating AMD) have developed a patented ion-exchange process that treats mine effluents (and AMD) economically.

Constructed wetlands
Constructed wetlands systems have been proposed during the 1980s to treat acid mine drainage generated by the abandoned coal mines in Eastern Appalachia.  Generally, the wetlands receive near-neutral water, after it has been neutralized by (typically) a limestone-based treatment process. Metal precipitation occurs from their oxidation at near-neutral pH, complexation with organic matter, precipitation as carbonates or sulfides. The latter results from sediment-borne anaerobic bacteria capable of reverting sulfate ions into sulfide ions. These sulfide ions can then bind with heavy metal ions, precipitating heavy metals out of solution and effectively reversing the entire process.

The attractiveness of a constructed wetlands solution lies in its relative low cost. They are limited by the metal loads they can deal with (either from high flows or metal concentrations), though current practitioners have succeeded in developing constructed wetlands that treat high volumes (see description of Campbell Mine constructed wetland) and/or highly acidic water (with adequate pre-treatment). Typically, the effluent from constructed wetland receiving near-neutral water will be well-buffered at 6.5–7.0 and can readily be discharged. Some of metal precipitates retained in sediments are unstable when exposed to oxygen (e.g., copper sulfide or elemental selenium), and it is very important that the wetland sediments remain largely or permanently submerged.

An example of an effective constructed wetland is on the Afon Pelena in the River Afan valley above Port Talbot where highly ferruginous discharges from the Whitworth mine have been successfully treated.

Precipitation of metal sulfides
Most base metals in acidic solution precipitate in contact with free sulfide, e.g. from H2S or NaHS. Solid-liquid separation after reaction would produce a base metal-free effluent that can be discharged or further treated to reduce sulfate, and a metal sulfide concentrate with possible economic value.

As an alternative, several researchers have investigated the precipitation of metals using biogenic sulfide. In this process, Sulfate-reducing bacteria oxidize organic matter using sulfate, instead of oxygen. Their metabolic products include bicarbonate, which can neutralize water acidity, and hydrogen sulfide, which forms highly insoluble precipitates with many toxic metals. Although promising, this process has been slow in being adopted for a variety of technical reasons.

Technologies 
Many technologies exist for the treatment of AMD.

Metagenomic study 

With the advance of large-scale sequencing strategies, genomes of microorganisms in the acid mine drainage community are directly sequenced from the environment. The nearly full genomic constructs allows new understanding of the community and able to reconstruct their metabolic pathways. Our knowledge of acidophiles in acid mine drainage remains rudimentary: we know of many more species associated with ARD than we can establish roles and functions.

Microbes and drug discovery 
Scientists have recently begun to explore acid mine drainage and mine reclamation sites for unique soil bacteria capable of producing new pharmaceutical leads. Soil microbes have long been a source for effective drugs and new research, such as that conducted at the Center for Pharmaceutical Research and Innovation, suggests these extreme environments to be an untapped source for new discovery.

List of selected acid mine drainage sites worldwide
This list includes both mines producing acid mine drainage and river systems significantly affected by such drainage. It is by no means complete, as worldwide, several thousands of such sites exist.

Africa
 West Rand Goldfield, Witwatersrand, South Africa

Europe
Avoca, County Wicklow, Ireland
Aznalcollar mine on the Guadiamar, Spain
Wheal Jane, Cornwall, England
Tinto River, Spain
Odiel River, Spain
Libiola's mine, Italy
Spree River, Germany
 The Lusatian Lake District and the Central German Lake District, both the product of open pit lignite mining, have to deal with acid mine drainage

North America
Argo Tunnel, Idaho Springs, Colorado, US
Berkeley Pit superfund site, covering the Clark Fork River and 50,000 acres (200 km2) in and around Butte, Montana, US
The Summitville Mine in Rio Grande County, Colorado. The area has both natural and mining-exacerbated acid drainage flowing into the Wrightman Fork, then into the Alamosa River, which flows into the San Luis Valley
Britannia Beach, British Columbia, Canada
Clinch-Powell River system, Virginia and Tennessee, US
Iron Mountain Mine, Shasta County, California, United States
Monday Creek, Ohio, US
The Irwin Syncline in Southwestern Pennsylvania
Pronto mine tailings site, Elliot Lake area, Ontario, Canada
North Fork of Kentucky River, Kentucky, US
Old Forge borehole, Lackawanna River, Pennsylvania. Discharges 40–100 million gallons of acid mine drainage per day.
Cheat River Watershed , West Virginia, US
Copperas Brook Watershed, from the Elizabeth Mine in S. Strafford, Vermont, impacting the Ompompanoosuc River
Davis Pyrite Mine in NW Massachusetts
Hughes bore hole, Pennsylvania
 Gold King Mine, Colorado, US

Oceania
Brukunga, South Australia
Grasberg mine, Papua province, Indonesia
McArthur River zinc mine, Northern Territory, Australia
Mount Morgan Mine, Queensland, Australia
Ok Tedi environmental disaster caused by Ok Tedi Mine, Ok Tedi River, Papua New Guinea
 Tui mine, an abandoned mine on the western slopes of Mount Te Aroha in the Kaimai Range of New Zealand, considered to be the most contaminated site in the country
West Coast mineral fields, Tasmania, Australia

See also
 Bioleaching
 Environmental issues with mining
 International Mine Water Association
 Passive treatment system
 Uranium acid mine drainage

References

External links

Managing Acid and Metalliferous Drainage: Leading Practice Sustainable Development Program for the Mining Industry Trove: Australian Government Dept. of Industry, Tourism and Resources handbook, 2007.  Accessed 21 May 2016.
AMRClearinghouse.org
OrangeWaterNetwork.org (EPCAMR's Website)
Assessment of treatment methods (PDF)
IMWA – International Mine Water Association
INAP – International Network of Acid Prevention
INAP – Global Acid Rock Drainage Guide
Overview of chemical processes involved
PADRE – Partnership for Acid Drainage Remediation in Europe
The Science of Acid Mine Drainage and Passive Treatment
USGS Mine Drainage
World's Most Acidic Waters are Found Near Redding, California (pH -3.6)
MiWER - Mine Water and Environment Research Centre (based in Australia)
Overview of acid mine drainage impacts in the West Rand Goldfield

Environmental impact of mining
Water management in mining